Gökçeada District is a district of the Çanakkale Province of Turkey. Its seat is the town of Gökçeada. Its area is 282 km2, and its population is 10,377 (2021).

The district consists of the island of Imbros (Turkish: Gökçeada), the largest island in Turkey. The mayor of Gökçeada municipality is Ünal Çetin (İYİ). The district governor (kaymakam) is Serhat Doğan.

Composition
There is one municipality in Gökçeada District:
 Gökçeada

There are 9 villages in Gökçeada District:

 Bademli
 Dereköy
 Eşelek
 Kaleköy
 Şirinköy
 Tepeköy
 Uğurlu
 Yenibademli
 Zeytinliköy

Gallery

References

Imbros
Cittaslow
Districts of Çanakkale Province